Citrullus colocynthis, with many common names including Abu Jahl's melon, (native name in Turkey) colocynth, bitter apple, bitter cucumber, egusi, vine of Sodom, or wild gourd, is a desert viny  plant native to the Mediterranean Basin and Asia, especially Turkey (especially in regions such as İzmir), and Nubia.

It resembles a common watermelon vine, but bears small, hard fruits with a bitter pulp. It originally bore the scientific name Colocynthis citrullus.

Description

Roots and stems
The roots are large, fleshy, and perennial, leading to a high survival rate due to the long tap root. The vine-like stems spread in all directions for a few meters looking for something over which to climb. If present, shrubs and herbs are preferred and climbed by means of auxiliary branching tendrils.

Leaves
Very similar to watermelon, the leaves are palmate and angular with three to seven divided lobes.

Flowers
The flowers are yellow and solitary in the axes of leaves and are borne by yellow-greenish peduncles. Each has a subcampanulated five-lobed corolla and a five-parted calyx. They are monoecious, so the male (stamens) and the female reproductive parts (pistils and ovary) are borne in different flowers on the same plant.
The male flowers’ calyx is shorter than the corolla. They have five stamens, four of which are coupled and one is single with monadelphous anther. The female flowers have three staminoids and a three-carpel ovary. The two sexes are distinguishable by observing the globular and hairy inferior ovary of the female flowers.

Fruits
The calyx englobe the yellow-green fruit which becomes marble (yellow stripes) at maturity. The mesocarp is filled with a soft, dry, and spongy white pulp, in which the seeds are embedded. Each of the three carpels bears six seeds. Each plant produces 15 to 30 fruits.

Seeds
They are similarly bitter, nutty-flavored, and rich in fat and protein. They are eaten whole or used as an oilseed. The oil content of the seeds is 17–19% (w/w), consisting of 67–73% linoleic acid, 10–16% oleic acid, 5–8% stearic acid, and 9–12% palmitic acid. The oil yield is about 400 L/hectare. In addition, the seeds contain a high amount of arginine, tryptophan, and the sulfur-containing amino acids.

Similar species 
It resembles the watermelon, which is in the same genus.

Distribution and habitat 

Citrullus colocynthis is a desert viney plant that grows in sandy, arid soils. It is native to the Mediterranean Basin and Asia, and is distributed among the west coast of northern Africa, eastward through the Sahara, Egypt until India, and reaches also the north coast of the Mediterranean and the Caspian Seas. It grows also in southern European countries and on the islands of the Grecian archipelago. On the island of Cyprus, it is cultivated on a small scale; it has been an income source since the 14th century and is still exported today.

It is an annual or a perennial plant in the wild in Indian arid zones, and survives under extreme xeric conditions.

Cultivation 
C. colocynthis, a perennial plant, can propagate both by generative and vegetative means. However, seed germination is poor due to the extreme xeric conditions, so vegetative propagation is more common and successful in nature. In the Indian arid zone, growth takes place between January and October, but the most favorable period for the vegetative growth is during summer, which coincides with the rainy season. Growth declines as soon as the rains and the temperature decrease and almost stops during the cold and dry months of December and January. Colocynth prefers sandy soils and is a good example of good water management which may be useful also on research to better understand how desert plants react to water stress. To enhance production, an organic fertilizer can be applied.
Colocynth is also commonly cultivated together with cassava (intercropping) in Nigeria.

Cultivated colocynth suffers of climatic stress and diseases such as cucumber mosaic virus, melon mosaic virus, Fusarium wilt, etc. as any other crop. To improve it, a relatively new protocol for regeneration has been developed with the aim of incorporating disease and stress resistance to increase yield potential and security avoiding interspecific hybridization barriers.

Uses

C. colocynthis can be eaten or processed for further uses in medicine and as energy source, e.g. oilseed and biofuel.
The characteristic small seed of the colocynth have been found in several early archeological sites in northern Africa and the Near East, specifically at Neolithic Armant, Nagada in Egypt; at sites dating from 3800 BC to Roman times in Libya; and the pre-pottery Neolithic levels of the Nahal Hemar caves in Israel. Zohary and Hopf speculate, "these finds indicate that the wild colocynth was very probably used by humans prior to its domestication."

Traditional medicine 
Colocynth has been widely used in traditional medicine for centuries.

In Arabia the colocynth had numerous uses in traditional medicine, such as a laxative, diuretic, or for insect bites. The powder of colocynth was sometimes used externally with aloes, unguents, or bandages. Lozenges or troches made of colocynth were called "troches of alhandal" or Trochisci Alhandalæ and used as a laxative. They were usually composed of colocynth, bdellium, and gum tragacanth. Alhandal was a term used in Arabia for the extract of colocynth and is derived from the Arabic الْحَنْظَل‎ al-Ḥanẓal, a name for colocynth.

In traditional Arab veterinary medicine, colocynth sap was used to treat skin eruptions in camels.

Culinary
The seeds of colocynth, which must be separated from the pulp and heated to make edible, have been used since antiquity as a food source in areas of the Sahara and Sahel where crops frequently fail or regular farming is impossible. The enigmatic early Egyptian ceramic Clayton rings found in the Western Desert may have been portable ovens for roasting colocynth seeds. The desert Bedouin are said to make a type of bread from the ground seeds. The closely related watermelon (Citrullus lanatus (Thunb)) was domesticated in Ancient Egypt, and may have been developed for edible seed from cultivated colocynth. In West Africa, some confusion exists between this species and watermelon, whose seeds may be used in much the same way. In particular, the name "egusi" may refer to either or both plants (or more generically to other cucurbits) in their capacity as seed crops, or to a popular soup made from these seeds. The seed flour is rich in micronutrients, and could therefore be used in food formulations especially in regions with endemic micronutrient deficiencies, such as West Africa.

The flowers can be eaten, and the stem tips are a source of water.

Other uses and research
The oil obtained from the seeds (47%) can be used for soap production. The production is not very time- and energy-consuming due to the ability of colocynth to grow on poor soils with just a little moisture and organic fertilizer. The fruits are harvested still unripe by hand, the rind is removed by peeling and the inner pulp filled with seeds is dried in the sun or in ovens. The seeds yield is about 6.7 to 10 t/ha, which means that for an oil profit of 31 to 47%, oil yields may reach up to 3 t/ha.

Oleic and linoleic acids isolated from C. colocynthis petroleum ether extracts show larvicidal activity against mosquitoes.

See also
Vine of Sodom

References

External links

 Information on oilseed uses

Cucurbitoideae
Edible nuts and seeds
Flora of Morocco
Flora of North Africa
Flora of Western Asia
Medicinal plants of Africa
Medicinal plants of Asia
Vines